Gayas Christopher (born 4 February 1987) is a Sri Lankan cricketer. He is a right-handed batsman and leg-break bowler who plays for Sri Lanka Navy Sports Club. He was born in Negombo.

Christopher made his first-class debut for the side against Seeduwa Raddoluwa Sports Club in the 2009–10 season. From the opening order, he scored 7 runs in the first innings in which he batted, and 52 runs in the second.

External links
Gayas Christopher at Cricinfo

1987 births
Living people
Sri Lankan cricketers
Sri Lanka Navy Sports Club cricketers